Hawkinsin (also known as 2-cystenyl-1,4-dihydroxycyclohexenylacetate) is an amino acid, which is formed after detoxification of a reactive tyrosine metabolite (quinol acetate) by glutathione. Hawkinsin is ninhydrin positive (a common test to detect amino acids and proteins with a free -NH2 group).

It is found in elevated concentrations in the urine in hawkinsinuria, which is probably related to the depletion of glutathione and resulting high excretion of 5-oxoproline.

References

Sulfur amino acids
Thioethers
Cyclohexenes
Non-proteinogenic amino acids